Pentalenic acid synthase (CYP105D7, sav7469 (gene)) is an enzyme with systematic name . This enzyme catalyses the following chemical reaction

 1-deoxypentalenate + reduced ferredoxin + O2  pentalenate + oxidized ferredoxin + H2O

Pentalenic acid synthase is a heme-thiolate enzyme (P-450).

References

External links 
 

EC 1.14.15